Coleophora polycarpaeae is a moth of the family Coleophoridae. It is found on the Canary Islands.

References

polycarpaeae
Moths of Africa
Moths described in 1927